On 3 May 2016, Kosovo became a full member of UEFA, the governing body of association football in Europe. Kosovo football clubs can qualify for UEFA's two of the three main continental competitions, the UEFA Champions League since the 2017–18 season and the UEFA Europa Conference League since the 2021–22 season.

Kosovo football clubs has also been able to qualify for the UEFA Europa League from 2017–18 season to 2020–21 season, but due to the change by UEFA of the way of qualifying in competitions based on the country coefficient, then Kosovo football clubs are not able to participate in this competition due to the low country coefficient.

UEFA rankings

Country coefficient

Club coefficient

Competitions

Active

UEFA Champions League

UEFA Europa League

UEFA Europa Conference League

Defunct

Mitropa Cup

Records

Top goalscorers
Players in bold are active in the Kosovo Superleague.
Penalty shootout goals are not included.

UEFA Champions League

UEFA Europa League

UEFA Europa Conference League

Notes and references

Notes

References

External links
 

European football clubs in international competitions
Football in Kosovo